Rubbish may refer to:
Waste
Garbage
Rubbish (magazine), a fashion magazine
Rubbish (radio series), a British radio series
"Rubbish", a song by Carter the Unstoppable Sex Machine
An adjective which is colloquially used in British English to describe something unpleasant or of poor quality, e.g. "This juice tastes like rubbish."